Prince of Players is a 1955 20th Century Fox biographical film about the 19th century American actor Edwin Booth. The film was directed and produced by Philip Dunne from a screenplay by Moss Hart, based on the book by Eleanor Ruggles. The music score was by Bernard Herrmann and the cinematography by Charles G. Clarke. The film was made in CinemaScope and in DeLuxe Color.

The cast featured  Richard Burton, Maggie McNamara and John Derek, along with Raymond Massey, Charles Bickford, Elizabeth Sellars and Eva Le Gallienne.

Plot

Edwin "Ned" Booth is the son of the noted thespian Junius Brutus Booth and the older brother of another actor, John Wilkes Booth. Beginning In 1848, as a boy, and into early manhood, he travels with and assists Junius, who is often drunk and seems at times on the brink of madness.

Several years go by. A theater owner, Dave Prescott, eagerly anticipates a Junius performance in San Francisco, but the actor is again unable to perform and decides to leave the theatrical run. Junius hands over his crown – a literal theatrical crown worn during his rendition of Richard III, to Ned, who has memorized his father's lines. Ned's first performance is of Richard III during a show at a mining camp, where the miners, disappointed at first, are ultimately pleased by what they see. Prescott, however, breaks the news shortly after that Junius has died.

Ned returns east, where John Wilkes Booth is starring in The Taming of the Shrew to great acclaim at Ford's Theatre in Washington, D.C. Billed as the son and successor to Junius Brutus Booth, John is planning a tour and asks Ned if he will be his manager along with their younger sister, Asia. Somewhat contemptuous of his upstart brother's early success as an actor, Ned declines. He tells his younger brother that he hasn't learned the craft the way he, Ned, has by traveling with, hearing the performances, and looking after their father for many years. Ned begins a theater tour of his own with Dave Prescott. He travels to New Orleans, where he meets, then soon marries, Mary Devlin, a member of a theatrical company who plays Juliet opposite Ned's role as Romeo.

The Civil War breaks out and John is said to be working steadfastly for the Confederacy's cause. He declines an offer from Ned to go to London together for a production of Hamlet, and when a pregnant Mary falls ill, Ned begins drinking heavily and missing performances.

Mary's death turns her husband morose. Then comes the terrible news one night that John Wilkes Booth has assassinated President Abraham Lincoln by gunshot at Ford's theater.

Weeks after the assassination, and his brother's subsequent death on a farm in Virginia, Ned has decided to return to the stage in Hamlet. On opening night the theater is packed by a mob incensed by the murder of the president and blaming not only Booth but all actors and theaters in general. One protester says the president "died in the very doorway to hell" because he was murdered in a theater.

Backstage, Dave Prescott tells Ned that the show must be canceled. Ned insists that he wants to go on for his profession as well as  his family name, remembering that his late wife once said that acting was his gift, his purpose in life and he must "never be derelict" to that purpose.

Ned is seated center stage on the throne as the curtain comes up. The mob hurls insults, vegetables, and other objects at Ned as the other actors rush off the stage. Ned remains seated, immobile, and absorbs the abuse until the crowd's fury exhausts itself. Finally one of the protesters declares "he's got guts", shouts "Booth, you're alright!", and begins clapping.

Gradually more of the mob join him, the other actors return to the stage, and the film ends with Ned hearing his late wife speaking part of Juliet's soliloquy as the crowd's approval continues to rise.

Cast

 Richard Burton as Edwin "Ned" Booth 
 Maggie McNamara as Mary Devlin 
 John Derek as John Wilkes Booth 
 Raymond Massey as Junius Brutus Booth 
 Charles Bickford as Dave Prescott 
 Elizabeth Sellars as Asia Booth 
 Christopher Cook as Edwin Booth at age 10 
 Dayton Lummis as English physician
 Ian Keith as Ghost of Hamlet's Father in Hamlet 
 Paul Stader as Laertes in Hamlet
 Louis Alexander as John Booth at age 12
 William Walker as Old Ben
 Charles Cane as Theater Assistant
 Mae Marsh as Witch in Macbeth
 Stanley Hall as Abraham Lincoln 
 Sarah Padden as Mary Todd Lincoln
 Ruth Clifford as English Nurse 
 Ivan Hayes as Bernardo in Hamlet
 Paul Frees as Francisco in Hamlet
 Ben Wright as Horatio in Hamlet
 Melinda Markey as Young Lady 
 Eleanor Audley as Mrs. Montchesington 
 Percival Vivian as Polonius in Hamlet
 George Melford as Stage Doorman 
 Ruth Warren as Nurse 
 Richard H. Cutting as Doctor 
 Lane Chandler as Colonel
 Steven Darrell as Maj. Rathbone 
 Tom Fadden as Trenchard 
 Henry Kulky as Bartender 
 Olan Soule as Catesby in Richard III
 Eva Le Gallienne as Queen Gertrude in Hamlet 
 Jack Raine as Theater Manager
 Paul Wexler as Miner
 Ethan Laidlaw as Barfly 
 Jack Mower as Man in Audience

Production

Original book
The film was based on a book by Eleanor Ruggles, published in February 1953. She started researching it in 1948.

The New York Times called it "an able biography." Another review in the same paper called it "enthralling". The book became a best seller.

Development
20th Century Fox bought the film rights in January 1953, before the book had been published. Richard Burton, who had a contract with the studio, was linked with the project from the beginning, although there were reports he might play John Wilkes Booth. Darryl F. Zanuck, head of Fox, reportedly wanted Laurence Olivier or Marlon Brando for Edwin Booth. Sol Siegel was the original producer.

In May 1953 Moss Hart signed to write the script.

In April 1953, Fox announced the film would be shot in CinemaScope.

Eventually Siegel dropped out as producer and was replaced by Philip Dunne. "Moss has done a really brilliant dramatisation of the book", said Dunne.

In November 1953, Richard Burton signed a new seven-film contract with Fox, the first of which was to be the lead in Prince of Players.

In June 1954, Jay Robinson was cast as John Wilkes Booth.

In July 1954, Eva Le Galliene was hired as technical consultant on the recommendation of Moss Hart She later agreed to appear in the film as an actor, performing in scenes with Burton. It was her first film. Dunne later said, "I couldn't find a director whom I thought could do justice to the script so Zanuck said 'direct it yourself'." In July Dunne was appointed director as well as producer.

Jay Robinson lost his part to John Derek.

Shooting
Filming started August 1954.

"On the first day, I was terrified", said Dunne. "There looking at me were Richard Burton, Raymond Massey, Eva Le Gallienne and up walks Charlie Bickford, old, cantankerous, and known to punch out directors before breakfast.' Anyone here you want me to kick real hard?' old Charlie asked."

Dunne said directing was "fun when you have a good story and players who know what they're supposed to do."

Dunne later said Hart's script was about half an hour too long and that Dunne trimmed it by cutting within scenes.

Reception
The film was a financial failure, the first movie in CinemaScope to lose money. Dunne said he thought "it was too larded with Shakespeare".

See also
List of American films of 1955

References

External links
 
 
 
 

1955 films
1950s biographical drama films
20th Century Fox films
American biographical drama films
Biographical films about actors
Films scored by Bernard Herrmann
Films directed by Philip Dunne
Films set in the 1860s
Depictions of Abraham Lincoln on film
Cultural depictions of John Wilkes Booth
1950s historical drama films
American historical drama films
CinemaScope films
1950s English-language films
1950s American films